Roar Høyland (born 13 July 1930) is a Norwegian industrial designer. He was born in Oslo. From 1971 to 1981 he was leader of the design department of the organization Norway Design. He was rector of the Norwegian National Academy of Craft and Art Industry from 1989 to 1986. Among his books are Mellom to stoler from 1980, Sidespor from 1986, and Oppsving from 1996, all in cooperation with Dagny and Finn Hald.

References 

1930 births
Living people
Artists from Oslo
Norwegian industrial designers